Admiral Charles Abbot, 2nd Baron Colchester PC (12 March 1798 – 18 October 1867), known as Charles Abbot before 1829, was a British naval commander and Conservative politician.

Background and education
Colchester was the son of Charles Abbot, 1st Baron Colchester, Speaker of the House of Commons, and Elizabeth, daughter of Sir Philip Gibbes, 1st Baronet. He was educated at Westminster School and the Royal Naval College, Dartmouth.

Naval career

Colchester served in the Royal Navy from 1811. He was promoted to Rear-Admiral in 1854, to Vice-Admiral in 1860 and to Admiral on the Reserved List in 1864.

Political career
Colchester succeeded to his father's peerage in 1829 and entered the House of Lords. However, it was not until 1835 that he made his maiden speech. He served under the Earl of Derby as Paymaster-General and Vice-President of the Board of Trade in 1852 and as Postmaster General between 1858 and 1859. In 1852 he was sworn of the Privy Council. Apart from his naval and political career he was also President of the Royal Geographical Society between 1845 and 1847. On 7 June 1853 the University of Oxford conferred on him a DCL.

Family
Lord Colchester married the Hon. Elizabeth Susan, daughter of Edward Law, 1st Baron Ellenborough, in 1836. He died in October 1867, aged 69, and was succeeded in the barony by his son, Reginald. Lady Colchester died in March 1883.

References

External links
 

1798 births
1867 deaths
2
Conservative Party (UK) hereditary peers
United Kingdom Postmasters General
People educated at Westminster School, London
Presidents of the Royal Geographical Society
Royal Navy admirals
Members of the Privy Council of the United Kingdom
Eldest sons of British hereditary barons